Tri-chess is the name of a chess variant for three players invented by George R. Dekle Sr. in 1986. The game is played on a board comprising 150 triangular cells. The standard chess pieces are present, minus the queens, and plus the chancellor and cardinal compound fairy pieces per side.

Tri-chess was included in World Game Review No. 10 edited by Michael Keller.

Game rules
The illustration shows the starting setup. White moves first and play proceeds clockwise around the board. When a player is checkmated or stalemated, his king is immediately removed from the game and his remaining men become the property of the player delivering the mate or stalemate. Pawns of appropriated armies do not change their direction of movement toward promotion. The last surviving player wins the game.

Piece moves   
 A bishop moves as the bishop in the tri-chess two-player game. (Namely, in six directions constituting board diagonals.)
 A rook moves as the rook in the tri-chess two-player game. (Namely, in six directions along horizontal ranks or oblique files.)
 A knight moves in the pattern: two steps as a bishop, then one step as a rook in an orthogonal direction. A knight leaps any intervening men.
 The chancellor moves as a rook and knight.
 The cardinal moves as a bishop and knight.
 The king moves as the king in the tri-chess two-player game. (Namely, one step as a bishop or two steps as a rook.) The king slides three cells whether castling "cardinal-side" or "chancellor-side".
 A pawn moves and captures as a pawn in triangular chess. (Namely, straight forward one step at a time, whether crossing a cell edge or vertex. On its first move it may optionally move two steps straight forward. A pawn captures to either cell adjoining the cell immediately in front, in the same rank.)

See also
 Three-player chess
 Also by George Dekle:
 Three-man chess
 Triangular chess – a two-player variant with triangular cells
 Trishogi – a two-player shogi variant with triangular cells

References

Bibliography

External links
 Tri-chess See detailed rule descriptions, piece movements and play this variant on Omnichess 

Chess variants
1986 in chess
Board games introduced in 1986